Captain America is a 1979 American made-for-television superhero film loosely based on the Marvel Comics character of the same name, directed by Rod Holcomb and starring Reb Brown. The film was followed by the sequel Captain America II: Death Too Soon, also released in the same year.

Plot
Steve Rogers (Reb Brown) is a former Marine whose father is a 1940s government agent. His father's patriotic attitude earns him the nickname "Captain America". His father is later murdered.

Rogers, now making a living as an artist and traveling the countryside in a conversion van, is inspired by his father's story to sketch a superhero. He is critically injured from an attempt on his life that is set up to seem like an accident.

He is administered an experimental serum called the FLAG formula, an acronym for "Full Latent Ability Gain" — a kind of "super-steroid" — which Rogers' father had developed from his own glands. The formula not only saves his life, but enhances his strength and reflexes. These new abilities inspire Dr. Simon Mills (Len Birman), the research biochemist and intelligence official behind FLAG who was once a friend of Steve's father, to recruit Steve and give him a costume based on his drawing.

As Captain America, Steve's conversion van is re-configured so that it can launch a high-tech motorcycle. The bike features rocket thrust — a jet booster for rapid acceleration — and a stealth setting that reduces engine and road noise. In the sequel, Captain America II: Death Too Soon it also possesses a detachable wing resembling a hang glider that allows limited gravity-powered flight. In addition, the bike has a detachable round windscreen that becomes Rogers' shield when he goes on foot, resembling the comics' shield with the white stripes being transparent. It is bulletproof, and can be thrown as a returning weapon without having to be ricocheted off surfaces. 

It soon is revealed that the villain intends to threaten to destroy a community with a neutron bomb. Unfortunately, when Captain America stops the truck transporting it and diverts an exhaust into the trailer to subdue any guards inside, he finds out that villain himself was inside wearing a deadman's switch detonator to the bomb measuring his heartbeat and is seriously affected by carbon monoxide poisoning. As a result, Captain America and Dr. Mills have to apply emergency first aid and are successful in keeping the villain alive so that detonator could be safely removed in custody.

In the final act of the film, Rogers decides to become the same Captain America as his father had been, donning a uniform identical to the one his father had worn: the "classic" Captain America uniform.

Cast
 Reb Brown as Steve Rogers / Captain America
 Len Birman as Dr. Simon Mills
 Heather Menzies as Dr. Wendy Day
 Robin Mattson as Tina Hayden
 Joseph Ruskin as  Rudy Sandrini
 Lance LeGault as Harley
 Frank Marth as Agent Charles Barber
 Steve Forrest as Lou Brackett
Chip Johnson as Jerry
James Ingersoll as Lester Wiant
Jim B. Smith  as F.B.I. Assistant
 Jason Wingreen as Surgeon
June Dayton  as Secretary
Diana Webster as Nurse
 Dan Barton  as Jeff Hayden

Release
The film was released theatrically in Colombia in 1981.

Reception
The movie received a mixed reception from critics.

Adaptation of elements in other media
The elements of the TV movies were emuulated in broad fashion in the Captain America comic book series. 

In issue #259, a young man that Captain America redeemed from associating with a criminal gang built a custom high-performance motorcycle in gratitude, which became a signature vehicle of the character for years. Apart from having considerable speed, the design is standard apart from its American Flag paint motif.

In issue #318, Rogers receives a specially customized conversion van courtesy of King T'Challa of Wakanda aka The Black Panther. The van has special communications equipment, an extendable periscope, a sleeping bunk when Rogers is travelling, a special frame so Rogers can launch from the van while riding his motorcycle, and has a special paint that can instantly change colors when Rogers desires it for stealth purposes.

References

External links
 
 

1979 television films
1979 films
1979 action films
1970s English-language films
1970s superhero films
Action television films
Captain America films
CBS network films
Films directed by Rod Holcomb
1970s American films
Live-action films based on Marvel Comics